HMS Larne (J274) was a reciprocating engine-powered  during the Second World War. She survived the war and was sold to Italy in 1947 as Alabarda (F 560).

Design and description

The ships' complement consisted of 85 officers and ratings.

The reciprocating ships had two vertical triple-expansion steam engines, each driving one shaft, using steam provided by two Admiralty three-drum boilers.

The Algerine class was armed with a QF  Mk V anti-aircraft gun and four twin-gun mounts for Oerlikon 20 mm cannon. The latter guns were in short supply when the first ships were being completed and they often got a proportion of single mounts. By 1944, single-barrel Bofors 40 mm mounts began replacing the twin 20 mm mounts on a one for one basis. All of the ships were fitted for four throwers and two rails for depth charges.

Construction and career

Service in the Royal Navy 
The ship was ordered on 3 May 1942 at the Lobnitz & Company at Renfrew, Scotland. She was laid down on 25 January 1943 and launched on 2 September 1942. She was commissioned on 22 November 1943.

On 31 July 1944, she was sent to the Mediterranean under the 7th Minesweeper Flotilla and supported Operation Dragoon on the 15 August. During Operation Edgehill on 15 October, she struck a sea mine while sweeping off Cape Kalouri, Greece, which caused major damage to her boiler and  No. 1 fuel tank. Unfortunately, two of her engine room crew were also killed by the explosion. Moreover, the flotilla leader, also struck a mine under her bow. The next day on the 16th, Larne was beached at Poros, East Coast of Greece. The ship was towed back shortly after and spent the remainder of the war under repair.

She was then sold to Italy in 1946 with the intention of replacing the lead ship of the Azio-class minelayer Azio, which was expected to be decommissioned.

Service in the Italian Navy 
Larne was renamed Ammiraglio Magnaghi and placed in the dock for the first urgent works; later the decision was taken to transform her into a colonial corvette with the name Eritrea, replacing the ship of the same name Eritrea sold to France in compliance with the Peace Treaty. When the colonial needs were lost during the modernization works started on 15 January 1949, she was called Alabarda and classified as an anti-submarine corvette.

In 1954, modernization works were carried out on the unit which saw the installation of a surface target detection radar SO 13, of US origin, and the replacement of the four 37/54 guns with two 40/56 guns.

In 1956 she underwent work for the transformation into a team or division command ship. Her deckhouse was extended towards the bow and the 100/47 mm gun was removed.

After being decommissioned from the Navy on 1 July 1968, on 17 September, the ship was transferred to the Garaventa Foundation and transformed into a Garaventa training ship.

On 12 August 1974, the ship was damaged following a collision with the Monica Rusotti ferry in Genoa and decommissioned in 1975. Transferred to La Spezia, the ship was dismantled and scrapped between 1981 and 1982.

References

Bibliography
 
 
 Peter Elliott (1977) Allied Escort Ships of World War II. MacDonald & Janes,

External links
 

 

Algerine-class minesweepers of the Royal Navy
Ships built in Scotland
1943 ships
World War II minesweepers of the United Kingdom
Corvettes of the Italian Navy